The 2010–11 Antalyaspor season was the 3rd consecutive season in the Turkish Super League and their 45th year in existence. They was also competed in the Turkish Cup.

Current squad

Competitions

Süper Lig

League table

Results summary

Results by matchday

References 

Antalyaspor seasons
Antalyaspor